The ash-colored Oldfield mouse (Thomasomys cinereus) is a species of rodent in the family Cricetidae. 
It is found in Ecuador and Peru.

References

Musser, G. G. and M. D. Carleton. 2005. Superfamily Muroidea. pp. 894–1531 in Mammal Species of the World a Taxonomic and Geographic Reference. D. E. Wilson and D. M. Reeder eds. Johns Hopkins University Press, Baltimore.

Thomasomys
Mammals of Peru
Mammals described in 1882
Taxa named by Oldfield Thomas
Taxonomy articles created by Polbot